The American Field Trip is an educational film series that explores unique places of interest across the USA. Episode titles include Exploring Marine Biology, at the Monterey Bay Aquarium in California, and Exploring Space Technology at the NASA Johnson Space Center in Texas. The series won a CINE competition Golden Eagle award in 1995. The series is produced by film maker James Myer.

References

External links
Official Site

The American Field Trip Publishers
Movie Reviews.com
NEMN Silver Apple

American documentary films
Educational materials
1995 television films
1995 films
1990s American films